Sakésho is a jazz quartet based band in France.

Sakésho is based in the beguine, the polyrhythmic music of the French Caribbean. The band members are Mario Canonge (piano), Michel Alibo (bass) and Jean-Philippe Fanfant (drums); all born in the French Caribbean, plus North American Andy Narell (steelpan).

The group is based in Paris. They perform under the direction of Heads Up International They recorded just two albums in the past five years, and have worked with the likes of several famous jazz musicians on their album projects.

Discography
Sakesho (2002)
We Want You to Say (2005)

References

External links
Sakésho at myspace
Sakesho's page on Andy Narell official website
2004 Concert review by Franz Matzner  at allaboutjazz.com

Heads Up International artists